The Handball Competitions at the 2014 South American Games took place at the Polideportivo Viña in Viña del Mar, Chile from March 7 to 16. There were two competitions, one each for men and women, each with five national teams competing. Brazil is the defending champion for the men's competition while Argentina is in the women's competitions. The top 3 teams in each tournament qualifies to compete at the 2015 Pan American Games in Toronto, Canada.

Medal summary

Medal table

Men

Group A

Group B

Semi-finals

Bronze-medal match

Gold-medal match

Women

References

2014 South American Games events
Qualification tournaments for the 2015 Pan American Games
2014 in handball
2014